Kemmel No. 1 French Cemetery is a Commonwealth War Graves Commission (CWGC) burial ground for the dead of the First World War located in the Ypres Salient on the Western Front.

The cemetery grounds were assigned to the United Kingdom in perpetuity by King Albert I of Belgium in recognition of the sacrifices made by the British Empire in the defence and liberation of Belgium during the war.

Foundation
The cemetery is unusual for having unknown origins. It was discovered by the French after the Armistice and contained the bodies of Commonwealth, French and German troops.

The cemetery was enlarged by concentrating nearby battlefield graves and three British  graves, two from a local churchyard and one from a nearby German cemetery.  Also included in the concentration were more German graves found in the former battlefields by the Belgians.  The cemetery was designed by Sir Edwin Lutyens.

See also
 Kemmelberg

References

External links

 
 

Commonwealth War Graves Commission cemeteries in Belgium
World War I cemeteries in Belgium
Cemeteries and memorials in West Flanders
Works of Edwin Lutyens in Belgium